Paul Michael Dzeruvs Sosa (born 1 November 1988 in Montevideo), known as Paul Dzeruvs, is an Uruguayan footballer who plays as a forward. He currently plays for Everton in the first division in Chile.
First division Rampla, Uruguay.
Goal=32

Teams
 Rentista 2005-2009
  Rampla Juniors 2009–2012
  Everton 2013–present
  Rampla Juniors 2013–2015

Notes

References

External links
 
 
 

1988 births
Living people
Uruguayan people of Lithuanian descent
Uruguayan footballers
Uruguayan expatriate footballers
Rampla Juniors players
C.A. Rentistas players
Everton de Viña del Mar footballers
Chilean Primera División players
Expatriate footballers in Chile
Footballers from Montevideo
Association football forwards